Annalisa Scurti (born 20 January 1969) is a former Italian female long-distance runner who competed at individual senior level at the IAAF World Half Marathon Championships.

She also won a bronze medal with the national team at the 1996 IAAF World Half Marathon Championships.

References

External links
 

1969 births
Living people
Italian female long-distance runners